Tromedja (Montenegrin and Serbian Cyrillic: Тромеђа, Tromeđa) is a mountain in the Bogićevica area in the Prokletije range. Albania contains the south of the mountain which is the majority of it, Kosovo the north-east and Montenegro the north-west. There is a valley in the Albanian and Kosovan side of the mountain. The village of Debërdol in Albania is located quite close to the summit.

Notes

References 

Mountains of Albania
Mountains of Kosovo
Mountains of Montenegro
Geography of Kukës County
Two-thousanders of Kosovo
Albania–Montenegro border